Seisetsu Shucho, also known as Daiyu Kokushi, (1745 – 28 June 1820) was a Japanese Zen priest, poet and artist, He is known for the reconstruction and consolidation of the Engaku-ji Zen Buddhist temple towards the end of the Edo era.

References

External links 

 SEISETSU Shucho, the Manyo'an Collection of Japanese Art.

Japanese poets
1745 births
1820 deaths
Rinzai Buddhists
Japanese Buddhist clergy